Sagenotriton is a genus of sea snails, marine gastropod mollusks in the superfamily Buccinoidea.

Species
 Sagenotriton ajax B. A. Marshall & Walton, 2019
 Sagenotriton bathybius (Bouchet & Warén, 1986)
 Sagenotriton bonaespei (Barnard, 1963)

References

External links
 Marshall, B. A. & Walton, K. (2019). A review of Buccipagoda Ponder, 2010 and descriptions of new species and a new genus (Gastropoda: Neogastropoda: Buccinoidea: Buccinidae). Molluscan Research. 39 (1): 70-81

Buccinoidea (unassigned)